Jan Borkus (September 19, 1920 – October 29, 2007) was a Dutch radio personality and actor, who specialized in radio drama. He was born and died in The Hague, Netherlands.

Filmography
 1966 - De Kijkkast - Gompie and Ritsaart (1966–1972)
 1976 - De Bereboot - Voice of Fred de Kei and Kokki
 1978 - Astronautjes - Robo

Radio Dramas 
 1953 - Sprong in het heelal – Jimmy Barnet (Serie 1, 2 en 3)
 1961 - Testbemanning - Jaap
 1985 - Dood van een vrijgezel - Businessman
 De blauwe zaden - Von Sommeren
 Prometheus XIII - Professor Curtis
 Moordbrigade Stockholm - Martin Beck
 Miserere - Edmond

External links
Jan Borkus obituary 

1920 births
2007 deaths
Male actors from The Hague
Dutch radio personalities
Dutch male voice actors
20th-century Dutch male actors
Dutch male radio actors